Riley Alvin Bender (July 8, 1890 – March 6, 1973) was a United States businessman and political candidate.

Born in Chicago, Illinois, to Josephine and Edward Bender, he was a lifelong resident of his native city. Bender was an entrepreuer in the areas of hotel and music store management. He was also a prize fighter.

He ran in the Democratic primary for the Illinois Senate (11th district) in 1938 and lost.

Bender is perhaps best known for his three bids for Republican Party Presidential nomination in the elections of 1944, 1948 and 
1952. In all three occasions he appeared only in his native Illinois ballot.

Although he was never a major candidate in these races, he won the 1948 Illinois primary in a landslide, with 96.90% (324,029) of votes against Douglas MacArthur (6,672 votes and 2.00%) and other well-known figures such as Harold Stassen, Thomas E. Dewey and Robert A. Taft, though only Bender was on the ballot as the rest were write-in votes.

Bender, who had German and Irish heritage, died in Chicago's Central Hospital and was buried in Onarga Cemetery.

Electoral history

Illinois Republican presidential primary, 1944
 Douglas MacArthur – 550,354 (92.02%)
 Riley A. Bender – 37,575 (6.28%)
 Thomas E. Dewey – 9,192 (1.54%)
 Everett Dirksen – 581 (0.10%)
 John W. Bricker – 148 (0.03%)
 Harold Stassen – 111 (0.02%)
 Wendell Willkie – 107 (0.02%)

Illinois Republican presidential primary, 1948
 Riley A. Bender – 324,029 (96.90%)
 Douglas MacArthur – 6,672 (2.00%)
 Harold Stassen – 1,572 (0.47%)
 Thomas E. Dewey – 953 (0.29%)
 Robert A. Taft – 705 (0.21%)

This gave Riley 11.34% of all primary votes

Illinois Republican presidential primary, 1952
 Robert A. Taft – 935,867 (73.56%)
 Harold Stassen – 155,041 (12.19%)
 Dwight D. Eisenhower – 147,518 (11.59%)
 Riley A. Bender – 22,321 (1.75%)
 Douglas MacArthur – 7,504 (0.59%)
 Earl Warren – 2,841 (0.22%)
 Others – 1,229 (0.10%)

External links

References
 OurCampaign.org

1890 births
1973 deaths
Illinois Republicans
Businesspeople from Chicago
Candidates in the 1944 United States presidential election
Candidates in the 1948 United States presidential election
Candidates in the 1952 United States presidential election
20th-century American politicians
Illinois Democrats